Carrier Aircraft Service Units (CASU) were United States Navy units formed during World War II for the Pacific War to support naval aircraft operations. From 1942 to 1946, 69 Carrier Aircraft Service Units were formed to repair and maintain aircraft. The first unit was deployed to Naval Station Pearl Harbor. The CASU-11, was deployed on January 22, 1943 at Naval Air Station San Diego. During the war the Navy lacked enough aircraft carriers to complete all the operational requirements.

History
In 1942, Ewa Field at Naval Base Hawaii became a major United States Marine Corps and US Navy aviation training facility for Carrier Aircraft Service Units (CASU). Flight crews and air mechanics trained at Ewa Field for the upcoming Pacific War, including Battles at Wake Island, Guadalcanal, and Midway. Aircraft mechanics of Carrier Aircraft Service Units traveled with the island hopping troops as new airfields were built across the Western Pacific Ocean. The many aircraft fighting and patrolling the South West Pacific theatre of war needed ongoing maintenance. CASU-11 was deployed for three years and nine months. CASU-11 decommissioned on November 1, 1946 at Naval Air Facility Yonabaru Okinawa with the war over. In that time CASU-11 traveled over 1,700 troops worked in CASU-11 and the unit traveled over 27,000 miles. CASU-11 worked on Naval planes at Naval Air Stations from Guadalcanal to Okinawa. Carrier Aircraft Service Units worked on seaplanes, fighter planes, bombers torpedo planes, dive bombers, and later night fighters. Out of necessity Carrier Aircraft Service Units sometimes worked on marine craft, United States Army Air Forces and other allied aircraft. Carrier Aircraft Service Units worked on aircraft carrier planes and land-based planes. Some Carrier Aircraft Service Units worked in United States on training aircraft and other planes. If needed a Carrier Aircraft Service Unit could be redesignated into a Combat Aircraft Service Unit, Scout Observation Service unit or Patrol Service units.

Carrier aircraft used during World War II by US Navy: (years used) (number built)
Douglas TBD Devastator - torpedo bomber (1937-1944) (130)
Grumman F4F Wildcat -  torpedo bomber (1941-1945) (7,885)
Grumman TBF Avenger  - torpedo bomber (1941-1948) (9,839)
Grumman F6F Hellcat - fighter-bomber (1942-1947) (12,275)
Curtiss SB2C Helldiver - dive bomber  (1943-1953) (7,140)
Vought F4U Corsair - fighter-bomber (1943-1953) (12,571)

Combat Aircraft Service Units

Scout Observation Service units
Scout Observation Service units, (SOSU) were like Carrier Aircraft Service Units but specialized on scout observation planes. Scout observation planes operated capital ships not in aircraft carrier task groups, like from battleships, cruisers and a few destroyers.

Patrol Service units
Patrol Service units, (PatSU) were like Carrier Aircraft Service Units but specialized on maintaining patrol aircraft. These units specialized on the Navy's land-based PB4Y-1 Liberator patrol bomber and later the Consolidated PB4Y-2 Privateer aircraft.

Blimp HedRon
Blimp HedRon, Blimp Headquarters Squadron, were Navy units that did maintenance on US Navy blimps in the Lighter-than‑air (LTA) service. Blimp HedRon operated like Carrier Aircraft Service Units but specialized in fabric damage and helium handling. Blimp HedRon did regular checks and minor repairs. Lighter-than‑air service mostly operated in the South Atlantic and Caribbean areas, like from Naval Base Trinidad bases. In good weather blimp could stay in the air for a longer time than planes, looking for U-boats. K-class blimp was the most common claas of blimp used by the Navy.

Aircraft repair ships

Some cargo ships were converted into Aircraft repair ships to aid in the repair needs of the island hopping campaign. The two Aventinus-class aircraft repair ship, USS Aventinus and USS Chloris, were one type of Aircraft repair ship. The Chourre-class aircraft repair ship was another type of repair ships. Two Chourre-class ships were built the: USS Chourre (ARV-1) and USS Webster (ARV-2).

Seaplane Tender
The US Navy operated a fleet of Seaplane tender used to maintain the many US navy Seaplanes. Some Seaplane tenders were cargo ships converted into Seaplane tenders. The USS Curtiss (AV-4) was the first ship built to be a Seaplane tender. Seaplane tender serviced and repaired seaplanes used in forward bases used for long-range patrol. Seaplane Tenders were able to do repair and maintenance and had all the supplies needed to operate in remote forward bases for months. Once and if a land-based forward base was built the Seaplane tender could move on to a more forward base. Seaplane tenders acted as barracks, supply depots, workshops, air mechanic and control towers for the planes.

Parts
The key to the Service Units was the supply of parts, keeping supply depots stocked with the needed parts. Both the UN Navy and the World War II United States Merchant Navy kept parts from the states flowing to the Advance Bases where they were needed.

Gallery

See also

Aviation machinist's mate
Operation Ivory Soap
US Naval Advance Bases
U.S. Naval Base Subic Bay
Espiritu Santo Naval Base
Naval Advance Base Saipan
Naval Base Noumea
US Navy airships during World War II

External links
United States Navy K-Type Airships Pilot’s Manual
youtube, Gerald Edward Houppert, Aviation Machinist's Mate Second Class, US Navy, World War Two
 youtube, Tustin Hangars - "Titans of History" Documentary
youtube, Wwii Blimp / Airship Operations Aboard Escort Carrier Uss Mindoro
youtube, America's WW2 Flying Boat That Came With A Kitchen, Martin PBM Mariner

References

United States Navy
Military engineering of the United States
Military units and formations established in 1942